Palestine–Turkey relations are the current and historical bilateral relations between Turkey and Palestine.

Turkey's aid has been a source of humanitarian relief to Palestine, especially since the start of the Blockade of the Gaza Strip imposed by Israel and Egypt.

History
In spite of Turkey's constructive relations with Israel, diplomacy between Turkey and the Palestinian National Authority has been relatively strong and helpful, especially when Prime Minister Recep Tayyip Erdoğan took action in verbally countering Israel's standoff against Gaza fighters. Historically, Palestine was under Turkish (Ottoman Empire) rule for four hundred years prior to the days of the British Mandate of Palestine. Ottoman rulers heavily restricted zionist immigration waves during its rule. Turkey has sought to steal Egypt's role as mediator in the Intra-Palestinian reconciliation process. It, along with Qatar, provides the Hamas movement with political humanitarian and diplomatic support. However, some analysts believe that Turkey is only using the Palestinian cause to advance its regional agenda and because it is highly popular among the Turkish public.. 
Turkey welcomed a UN vote on 30 November 2012, giving Palestine non-member statehood in the world body, saying the dramatic gesture would bolster the moribund Israeli-Palestinian peace process.

See also 
 Foreign relations of Palestine 
 Foreign relations of Turkey 
 Israel–Turkey relations

References

 
Bilateral relations of Turkey
Turkey